Brisa Roché (born  in Arcata, California) is an American singer-songwriter who has spent much of her life residing in France. She moved to Paris after the death of her father, an adventurer, and began busking at age 18 in the Paris Metro; the founders of Glazart noticed her and, a few years later, she signed with Blue Note. She has performed folk, garage, psyche-pop, soul and electronica. Her first album, The Chase, was released  in Paris; reviewing the album in Billboard, Aymeric Pichevin wrote, "A PJ Harvey fan, Roché delivers jazzy tunes with a punk spirit." In 2016, Roché released Invisible 1. She returned to the United States in the course of writing her fourth album, which Rolling Stone described as "succeed[ing] in capturing the essence of pop in order to restore it to a song that was both pure and sensual."

Discography

Albums 
 2003 : Soothe Me
 2005 : The Chase (Blue Note / Capitol)
 2007 : Takes (Discograph)
 2010 : All Right Now (Discograph)
 2016 : invisible1
 2018 : Father
 2020 : Low Fidelity
 2021 : Freeze Where U R (with Fred Fortuny)

References

External links 

1976 births
21st-century American singers
21st-century American women singers
American expatriates in France
American women jazz singers
American jazz singers
American women pop singers
Jazz musicians from California
Living people
People from Arcata, California